Francis Joseph Bryant  (7 November 1909 – 11 March 1984) was an Australian cricketer who played first-class cricket for Western Australia from 1927 to 1936. He later became Western Australia's leading cricket administrator.

Cricket playing career

Bryant attended Christian Brothers' College, Perth, where in the 1927 season he scored more than 1000 runs in the First XI. Playing in the era before Western Australia was admitted to the Sheffield Shield, he made his first-class debut for Western Australia at the age of 17 in March 1927, alongside his older brothers Dick and Bill (who was playing his only first-class match) against South Australia at the WACA Ground in Perth. The next season, in a match at the WACA Ground against Victoria, he scored 113 not out in the second innings after Western Australia had trailed by 194 runs on the first innings. In 1933-34 he and Dick each made a century when Western Australia narrowly failed to achieve an innings victory over Victoria at the Melbourne Cricket Ground.

In 1935-36 he toured India with Frank Tarrant's Australian team. He made his highest first-class score of 155 in the match against Bombay and played in all four matches against India.

Cricket administrative career
After service in the army in World War II Bryant went into the hotel business and became Western Australia's most prominent cricket administrator. In the 1950s he successfully argued that Western Australia should play a full Sheffield Shield program, and later he was one of the leading advocates for Test status for the WACA Ground, which was achieved in 1970. He managed the Australian teams that toured New Zealand in 1966-67, 1969-70 and 1973-74. For his services to cricket he was awarded the Medal of the Order of Australia in 1981 and the Australian Sports Medal posthumously in 2000.

References

External links

1909 births
1984 deaths
People educated at Christian Brothers' College, Perth
Western Australia cricketers
Australian cricketers
Australian cricket administrators
Cricketers from Perth, Western Australia
Recipients of the Medal of the Order of Australia
Recipients of the Australian Sports Medal